Eophrynidae is a family of the extinct arachnid order Trigonotarbida. Eophrynids lived during the Carboniferous period in what is now modern Europe and North America. The family is probably found within the "eophrynid assemblage" clade: (Aphantomartus (Alkenia (Pseudokreischeria (Kreischeria (Eophrynus + Pleophrynus))))).

Genera
Areomartus Petrunkevitch, 1913
Eophrynus Woodward, 1871
Nyranytarbus  Harvey & Selden, 1995
Petrovicia  Frič, 1904 
Planomartus  Petrunkevitch, 1953
Pleophrynus  Petrunkevitch, 1945
Pocononia  Petrunkevitch, 1953 
Somaspidion  Jux, 1982
Stenotrogulus  Frič, 1904
Vratislavia  Frič, 1904

References 

Trigonotarbids
Carboniferous arachnids
Carboniferous arthropods of Europe
Carboniferous arthropods of North America
Pennsylvanian first appearances
Mississippian extinctions
†
Prehistoric arthropod families